New Serbia may refer to:

 New Serbia (political party), political party in Serbia, established in 1998
 New Serbia (historical province), historical province in the 18th century Russian Empire

See also 
 Serbia (disambiguation)
 Serbian (disambiguation)